Patan Minara is believed to be a 2,000 year old Buddhist monastery situated eight kilometers from Rahim Yar Khan city, located in Pakistan. Patan minara was built during Hakrra valley civilization around 250BC. It was once the capital of a kingdom in 10 AD as mentioned by Colonel Toy. Some archeologists believe that the structure was built by Alexander the Great when he passed through this area on his way to India for military expedition. As was his practice, Alexander set up a cantonment here under a Greek governor and tower served for keeping a watchful eye on the local tribes. There is a mystery behind it that there was once treasure hidden in that historical building. By the 18th century when Patan Minara was demolished they discovered a brick with sanskrit written on it.

Near by the Patan Minara are still remains of the fort, mosque and tunnels. Colonel Minchin who was the political agent of ex-Bhawalpur state about 110 years ago, passed an order to excavate the place, but during the process of digging the workers came across a semi-liquid swarmed flies that killed them at spot. Due to this event he had to stop the digging. Later during 18th century Fazal Elahi Khan Halani who was a Daupauta chief used its remaining to build baghla & Dingar Forte.

References

Buddhist monasteries in Pakistan
History of Pakistan
3rd-century BC Buddhism
3rd-century BC religious buildings and structures